The Barremian is an age in the geologic timescale (or a chronostratigraphic stage) between 129.4 ± 1.5 Ma (million years ago) and 121.4 ± 1.0 Ma). It is a subdivision of the Early Cretaceous Epoch (or Lower Cretaceous Series). It is preceded by the Hauterivian and followed by the Aptian Stage.

Stratigraphic definitions
The original type locality for the Barremian Stage is in the vicinity of the village of Barrême, Alpes-de-Haute-Provence, France. Henri Coquand defined the stage and named it in 1873. 

The base of the Barremian is determined by the first appearance of the ammonites Spitidiscus hugii and Spitidiscus vandeckii.  The end of the Barremian is determined by the geomagnetic reversal at the start of the M0r chronozone, which is biologically near the first appearance of the ammonite Paradeshayesites oglanlensis.

Regional equivalents
The Barremian falls in the Gallic epoch, a subdivision of the Cretaceous that is no longer used by the ICS. It overlaps the lower part of the Urgonian stage, which is sometimes used in western European stratigraphy. In North America, the late Coahulian and the early Comanchean correspond to the Barremian. In New Zealand, it falls within the Mokoiwian, and in Japan it corresponds to the late Aritan.

Subdivision
The Barremian is often subdivided into two substages or subages, Lower/Early and Upper/Late Barremian.

In the Tethys domain, the Barremian stage contains eleven ammonite biozones:
 zone of Pseudocrioceras waagenoides
 zone of Colchidites sarasini
 zone of Imerites giraudi
 zone of Hemihoplites feraudianus
 zone of Gerhardtia sertousi
 zone of Ancyloceras vandenheckii
 zone of Coronites darsi
 zone of Kotetishvilia compressissima
 zone of Nicklesia pulchella
 zone of Nicklesia nicklesi
 zone of Spitidiscus hugii

References

Notes

Literature
  (1907): Le Barrémien supérieur à faciès Urgonien de Brouzet-lès-Alais (Gard). Mémoires de la Société Géologique de France, Paléontologie 15(37): 5-42. 
; (2004): A Geologic Time Scale 2004, Cambridge University Press.
  (2006): Assessment of diachronism of biostratigraphic boundaries by magnetochronological calibration of zonal scales for the Lower Cretaceous of the Tethyan and Boreal belts. Doklady Earth Sciences 409(6): 843-846.

External links 
GeoWhen Database - Barremian
Mid-Cretaceous timescale, at the website of the subcommission for stratigraphic information of the ICS
Stratigraphic chart of the Lower Cretaceous, at the website of Norges Network of offshore records of geology and stratigraphy

 
04
Geological ages
Cretaceous geochronology